John Hethe was the member of the Parliament of England for Salisbury for the parliament of September 1388. He was also reeve and mayor of Salisbury.

References 

Members of Parliament for Salisbury
English MPs September 1388
Year of birth unknown
Year of death unknown
Mayors of Salisbury
Reeves (England)